María Valdés may refer to:

 María Fernanda Valdés (born 1992), Chilean weightlifter
 María Teresa Valdés (1961–2003), Spanish archer